Carole Anne Malone (born 14 October 1954) is an English TV presenter, journalist and broadcaster.

Career
Malone was born on 14 October 1954 in the mining village of West Allotment, near Newcastle upon Tyne. She started her career as a journalist before moving into television. She hosted her own light-hearted court show, Guilty!, on Sky One from 1997 to 1999.

In 2002 and 2005, Malone was a guest panellist on Loose Women, later returned as a guest anchor covering Jackie Brambles' maternity in 2007.

Between 2006 and 2010, Malone was a regular panellist on The Wright Stuff, and again from 2013 to 2018 on Channel 5. She appears regularly on Jeremy Vine on Wednesdays, its successor in the same slot.

In 2006, she appeared on the ITV reality show Celebrity Fit Club. She was made team captain of Bobby, Sharon and Micky, and lost three stone.

In 2007, Malone was the seventh celebrity housemate to enter Celebrity Big Brother in January 2007 and was second to be evicted from the Big Brother House on 12 January 2007. Malone had often been critical of Big Brother and on her entering the house, host Davina McCall read out many of Malone's criticisms, to jeers from the live crowd. After spending 10 years at the Sunday Mirror, she then wrote for the News of the World until its closure in July 2011. In an article earlier in 2011 Malone had written of how proud she'd always been of the News of the World, despite spending ten years working with its fiercest rival at the Sunday Mirror.

From September 2007 to April 2011, she appeared as a regular discussion contributor on The Alan Titchmarsh Show and, since 2009, has regularly reviewed the newspapers on This Morning.

From 2017 to 2021, Malone appeared weekly as a presenter on Sky News' The Pledge. Since 2021, she has appeared regularly on GB News and every Wednesday, on Jeremy Vine.

Controversy
In 2009, a complaint was made to the Press Complaints Commission about a Malone column in the News of the World, which claimed that illegal immigrants receive "free cars", leading to the newspaper being forced to issue a clarification that "illegal immigrants do not receive such a benefit and apologise for the error".

Celia Larkin, writing on 12 February 2012 in the Irish Sunday Independent, said of Heather Mills "Is it any wonder she was reduced to tears in the October 2007 GMTV interview? Did we feel sympathy for her then? No. 'Heather Mills has Melt Down' screamed the headlines, so now she had lost her marbles to boot. And if that wasn't enough, Carole Malone of the Sunday Mirror, one of the papers that were relentless in their attacks on Mills, accused her of staging an act on live TV in order to further her cause in the upcoming divorce hearing. How cruel can you get?"

On 14 May 2012, while on ITV's This Morning, her comments implied a family were partly to blame for the deaths of six children in an arson attack as they received significant state benefits which she felt drew resentment from the local populace, describing the events as "an accident waiting to happen". ITV apologised for the comments.

Personal life
Malone is married to Emir Mulabegovic, a Bosnian man. They live in London.

References

External links
 
 Images of Carole

1954 births
Living people
People from Newcastle upon Tyne
English journalists
English television presenters